Powell Middle School may refer to:

JP Powell Middle School (LaFayette, Alabama), USA
John Wesley Powell Middle School (Centennial, Colorado), USA
Powell Middle School (Littleton, Colorado), USA
Powell Middle School, Hernando County School Board, Spring Hill, Florida, USA
Colin Powell Middle School (Matteson), Elementary School District 159, Illinois, USA
Powell Middle School, Romeo Community Schools, Romeo, Michigan, USA
Powell Middle School (Powell, Tennessee), USA

See also

 Powell (disambiguation)
 
 Powell High School (disambiguation)